Eksplozija is the nineteenth studio album by Serbian singer Dragana Mirković. It was released in 2008.

Track listing
Nauči me (Teach me)
Laste (Swallows)
Zemljo okreni se (Earth, turn around)
Pun je grad života (City is full of life)
Jedino moje (My one and only)
Zapaliću srce (I'll light up my heart)
Nešto lepo (Something nice)
Slavuji (Nightingales)
Sve bih dala da si tu (I would give everything for you to be here)
Eksplozija (Explosion)
Ti me rani (You hurt me)
Ko je ta (Who is she)
Život moj (featuring Daniel Đokić) (My life)
Jači nego ikad (featuring Mile Kitić, Šemsa Suljaković, Sinan Sakić and Kemal Malovčić) (Stronger than ever)

References

2008 albums
Dragana Mirković albums